The Federal Art Project (1935–1943) was a New Deal program to fund the visual arts in the United States. Under national director Holger Cahill, it was one of five Federal Project Number One projects sponsored by the Works Progress Administration (WPA), and the largest of the New Deal art projects. It was created not as a cultural activity, but as a relief measure to employ artists and artisans to create murals, easel paintings, sculpture, graphic art, posters, photography, theatre scenic design, and arts and crafts. The WPA Federal Art Project established more than 100 community art centers throughout the country, researched and documented American design, commissioned a significant body of public art without restriction to content or subject matter, and sustained some 10,000 artists and craft workers during the Great Depression. According to American Heritage, “Something like 400,000 easel paintings, murals, prints, posters, and renderings were produced by WPA artists during the eight years of the project’s existence, virtually free of government pressure to control subject matter, interpretation, or style.”

Background

The Federal Art Project was the visual arts arm of Federal Project Number One, a program of the Works Progress Administration, which was intended to provide employment for struggling artists during the Great Depression. Funded under the Emergency Relief Appropriation Act of 1935, it operated from August 29, 1935, until June 30, 1943. It was created as a relief measure to employ artists and artisans to create murals, easel paintings, sculpture, graphic art, posters, photographs, Index of American Design documentation, museum and theatre scenic design, and arts and crafts. The Federal Art Project operated community art centers throughout the country where craft workers and artists worked, exhibited, and educated others. The project created more than 200,000 separate works, some of them remaining among the most significant pieces of public art in the country.

The Federal Art Project's primary goals were to employ out-of-work artists and to provide art for nonfederal municipal buildings and public spaces. Artists were paid $23.60 a week; tax-supported institutions such as schools, hospitals, and public buildings paid only for materials. The work was divided into art production, art instruction, and art research. The primary output of the art-research group was the Index of American Design, a mammoth and comprehensive study of American material culture.

As many as 10,000 artists were commissioned to produce work for the WPA Federal Art Project, the largest of the New Deal art projects. Three comparable but distinctly separate New Deal art projects were administered by the United States Department of the Treasury: the Public Works of Art Project (1933–1934), the Section of Painting and Sculpture (1934–1943), and the Treasury Relief Art Project (1935–1938).

The WPA program made no distinction between representational and nonrepresentational art. Abstraction had not yet gained favor in the 1930s and 1940s, so was virtually unsalable. As a result, the Federal Art Project supported such iconic artists as Jackson Pollock before their work could earn them income.

One particular success was the Milwaukee Handicraft Project, which started in 1935 as an experiment that employed 900 people who were classified as unemployable due to their age or disability. The project came to employ about 5,000 unskilled workers, many of them women and the long-term unemployed. Historian John Gurda observed that the city's unemployment hovered at 40% in 1933. "In that year," he said, "53 percent of Milwaukee's property taxes went unpaid because people just could not afford to make the tax payments." Workers were taught bookbinding, block printing, and design, which they used to create handmade art books and children's books. They produced toys, dolls, theatre costumes, quilts, rugs, draperies, wall hangings, and furniture that were purchased by schools, hospitals, and municipal organizations for the cost of materials only. In 2014, when the Museum of Wisconsin Art mounted an exhibition of items created by the Milwaukee Handicraft Project, furniture from it was still being used at the Milwaukee Public Library.

Holger Cahill was national director of the Federal Art Project. Other administrators included Audrey McMahon, director of the New York Region (New York, New Jersey, and Philadelphia); Clement B. Haupers, director for Minnesota; George Godfrey Thorp (Illinois), and Robert Bruce Inverarity, director for Washington. Regional New York supervisors of the Federal Art Project have included sculptor William Ehrich (1897–1960) of the Buffalo Unit (1938–1939), project director of the Buffalo Zoo expansion.

Notable artists

Some 10,000 artists were commissioned to work for the Federal Art Project. Notable artists include the following:

 William Abbenseth
Berenice Abbott
 Ida York Abelman
 Gertrude Abercrombie
 Benjamin Abramowitz
 Abe Ajay
 Ivan Albright
 Maxine Albro
Charles Alston
 Harold Ambellan
 Luis Arenal
 Bruce Ariss
 Victor Arnautoff
 Sheva Ausubel
 Jozef Bakos
 Henry Bannarn
 Belle Baranceanu
 Patrociño Barela
 Will Barnet
 Richmond Barthé
 Herbert Bayer
 William Baziotes
 Lester Beall
 Harrison Begay
Daisy Maud Bellis
 Rainey Bennett
 Aaron Berkman
 Leon Bibel
 Robert Blackburn
 Arnold Blanch
 Lucile Blanch
 Lucienne Bloch
 Aaron Bohrod
 Ilya Bolotowsky
 Adele Brandeis
 Louise Brann
 Edgar Britton
 Manuel Bromberg
 James Brooks
 Selma Burke
 Letterio Calapai
 Samuel Cashwan
 Giorgio Cavallon
 Daniel Celentano
 Dane Chanase
 Fay Chong
 Claude Clark
 Max Arthur Cohn
 Eldzier Cortor
 Arthur Covey
 Alfred D. Crimi
 Francis Criss
 Allan Crite
 Robert Cronbach
 John Steuart Curry
 Philip Campbell Curtis
 James Daugherty
Stuart Davis
 Adolf Dehn
 Willem de Kooning
 Burgoyne Diller
 Isami Doi
 Mabel Dwight
 Ruth Egri
 Fritz Eichenberg
 Jacob Elshin
 George Pearse Ennis
 Angna Enters
 Philip Evergood
 Louis Ferstadt
 Alexander Finta
 Joseph Fleck
 Seymour Fogel
 Lily Furedi
 Todros Geller
 Aaron Gelman
 Eugenie Gershoy
 Enrico Glicenstein
 Vincent Glinsky
 Bertram Goodman
 Arshile Gorky
 Harry Gottlieb
 Blanche Grambs
 Morris Graves
 Balcomb Greene
 Marion Greenwood
 Waylande Gregory
Philip Guston
 Irving Guyer
 Abraham Harriton
 Marsden Hartley
 Knute Heldner
 August Henkel
 Ralf Henricksen
 Magnus Colcord Heurlin
 Hilaire Hiler
 Louis Hirshman
 Donal Hord
 Axel Horn
 Milton Horn
 Allan Houser
 Eitaro Ishigaki
 Edwin Boyd Johnson
 Sargent Claude Johnson
 Tom Loftin Johnson
William H. Johnson
 Leonard D. Jungwirth
 Reuben Kadish
 Sheffield Kagy
 Jacob Kainen
 David Karfunkle
 Leon Kelly
 Paul Kelpe
 Troy Kinney
 Georgina Klitgaard
 Gene Kloss
 Karl Knaths
 Edwin B. Knutesen
 Lee Krasner
 Kalman Kubinyi
Yasuo Kuniyoshi
Jacob Lawrence
 Edward Laning
 Michael Lantz
 Blanche Lazzell
 Tom Lea
 Lawrence Lebduska
 Joseph Leboit
 William Robinson Leigh
 Julian E. Levi
 Jack Levine
 Monty Lewis
 Elba Lightfoot
 Abraham Lishinsky
 Michael Loew
 Thomas Gaetano LoMedico
 Louis Lozowick
 Nan Lurie
 Guy Maccoy
 Stanton Macdonald-Wright
 George McNeil
 Moissaye Marans
 David Margolis
 Kyra Markham
 Jack Markow
 Mercedes Matter
 Jan Matulka
 Dina Melicov
 Hugh Mesibov
 Katherine Milhous
 Jo Mora
 Helmuth Naumer
 Louise Nevelson
 James Michael Newell
 Spencer Baird Nichols
 Elizabeth Olds
 John Opper 
 William C. Palmer
 Phillip Pavia
 Irene Rice Pereira
 Jackson Pollock
 George Post
 Gregorio Prestopino
 Mac Raboy
 Anton Refregier
Ad Reinhardt
 Misha Reznikoff
 Mischa Richter
 Diego Rivera
 José de Rivera
 Emanuel Glicen Romano
 Mark Rothko
 Alexander Rummler
 Augusta Savage
 Concetta Scaravaglione
 Louis Schanker
 Edwin Scheier
 Mary Scheier
 Carl Schmitt
 William S. Schwartz
 Georgette Seabrooke
 Ben Shahn
 William Howard Shuster
 Mitchell Siporin
 John French Sloan
 Joseph Solman
 William Sommer
 Isaac Soyer
 Moses Soyer
 Raphael Soyer
 Ralph Stackpole
 Cesare Stea
 Walter Steinhart
 Joseph Stella
 Harry Sternberg
 Sakari Suzuki
 Albert Swinden
 Rufino Tamayo
 Elizabeth Terrell
 Lenore Thomas
 Dox Thrash
 Mark Tobey
 Harry Everett Townsend
 Edward Buk Ulreich
Charles Umlauf
 Jacques Van Aalten
 Stuyvesant Van Veen
 Herman Volz
Mark Voris
 John Augustus Walker
 Andrew Winter
 Jean Xceron
 Edgar Yaeger
 Bernard Zakheim
 Karl Zerbe

Community Art Center program

The first federally sponsored community art center opened in December 1936 in Raleigh, North Carolina.

Index of American Design

The Index of American Design program of the Federal Art Project produced a pictorial survey of the crafts and decorative arts of the United States from the early colonial period to 1900. Artists working for the Index produced nearly 18,000 meticulously faithful watercolor drawings, documenting material culture by largely anonymous artisans. Objects surveyed ranged from furniture, silver, glass, stoneware and textiles to tavern signs, ships's figureheads, cigar-store figures, carousel horses, toys, tools and weather vanes. Photography was used only to a limited degree since artists could more accurately and effectively present the form, character, color and texture of the objects. The best drawings approach the work of such 19th-century trompe-l'œil painters as William Harnett; lesser works represent the process of artists who were given employment and expert training.

"It was not a nostalgic or antiquarian enterprise," wrote historian Roger G. Kennedy. "It was initiated by modernists dedicated to abstract design, hoping to influence industrial design — thus in many ways it parallelled the founding philosophy of the Museum of Modern Art in New York."

Like all WPA programs, the Index had the primary purpose of providing employment. Its function was to identify and record material of historical significance that had not been studied and was in danger of being lost. Its aim was to gather together these pictorial records into a body of material that would form the basis for organic development of American design — a usable American past accessible to artists, designers, manufacturers, museums, libraries and schools. The United States had no single comprehensive collection of authenticated historical native design comparable to those available to scholars, artists and industrial designers in Europe.

"In one sense the Index is a kind of archaeology," wrote Holger Cahill. "It helps to correct a bias which has tended to relegate the work of the craftsman and the folk artist to the subconscious of our history where it can be recovered only by digging. In the past we have lost whole sequences out of their story, and have all but forgotten the unique contribution of hand skills in our culture."

The Index of American Design operated in 34 states and the District of Columbia from 1935 to 1942. It was founded by Romana Javitz, head of the Picture Collection of the New York Public Library, and textile designer Ruth Reeves. Reeves was appointed the first national coordinator; she was succeeded by C. Adolph Glassgold (1936) and Benjamin Knotts (1940). Constance Rourke was national editor. The work is in the collection of the National Gallery of Art in Washington, D.C.

The Index employed an average of 300 artists during its six years in operation. One artist was Magnus S. Fossum, a longtime farmer who was compelled by the Depression to move from the Midwest to Florida. After he lost his left hand in an accident in 1934, he produced watercolor renderings for the Index, using magnifiers and drafting instruments for accuracy and precision. Fossum eventually received an insurance settlement that made it possible for him to buy another farm and leave the Federal Art Project.

In her essay,'Picturing a Usable Past,' Virginia Tuttle Clayton, curator of the 2002-2003 exhibition, Drawing on America's Past: Folk Art, Modernism, and the Index of American Design, held at the National Gallery of Art noted that "the Index of American Design was the result of an ambitious and creative effort to furnish for the visual arts a usable past."

Poster Division

The WPA Poster Division was headed by Richard Floethe. The WPA Poster Division is thought to have produced upward of 35,000 designs and printed some two million posters, originally by hand but quickly transitioning to widespread adoption of the silkscreen process. The Poster Division began in New York City and by 1938 had artists in 18 states; the Chicago unit was the second-most productive after New York. According to preeminent New Deal art historian Francis V. O’Connor, only about 2,000 surviving examples of WPA poster art are held in the nation’s library and museum print collections.

WPA Art Recovery Project

Hundreds of thousands of artworks were commissioned under the Federal Art Project. Many of the portable works have been lost, abandoned, or given away as unauthorized gifts. As custodian of the work, which remains federal property, the General Services Administration (GSA) maintains an inventory and works with the FBI and art community to identify and recover WPA art. In 2010, it produced a 22-minute documentary about the WPA Art Recovery Project, "Returning America’s Art to America", narrated by Charles Osgood.

In July 2014, the GSA estimated that only 20,000 of the portable works have been located to date. In 2015, GSA investigators found 122 Federal Art Project paintings in California libraries, where most had been stored and forgotten.

See also
List of Federal Art Project artists
Section of Painting and Sculpture
Public Works of Art Project
Farm Security Administration which employed photographers.

References

Further reading
 DeNoon, Christopher. Posters of the WPA (Los Angeles: Wheatley Press, 1987).
 Grieve, Victoria. The Federal Art Project and the Creation of Middlebrow Culture (2009) excerpt

 Kelly, Andrew, Kentucky by Design: American Culture, the Decorative Arts and the Federal Art Project's Index of American Design, University Press of Kentucky, 2015, 
 Russo, Jillian. "The Works Progress Administration Federal Art Project Reconsidered." Visual Resources 34.1-2 (2018): 13-32.

External links

The Living New Deal research project and online public archive at the University of California, Berkeley
Recovering America's Art for America (2010), General Services Administration short documentary about efforts to recover WPA art
 Posters for the People, online archive of WPA posters
WPA Posters collection at the Library of Congress
New Deal Art Registry
wpamurals.com  – links to each state, with examples of WPA art in each
Federal Art Project Photographic Division collection at the Smithsonian Archives of American Art
"1934: A New Deal for Artists" Exhibition at the Smithsonian American Art Museum
“Art Within Reach”: Federal Art Project Community Art Centers at George Mason University
WPA Murals and American Abstract Artists at American Abstract Artists
WPA Prints and Murals in New York
Collection: "Art of the Works Progress Administration WPA" from the University of Michigan Museum of Art
WNYC and the WPA Federal Art Project

 
New Deal projects of the arts
Works Progress Administration
New Deal agencies
American art
Murals in the United States
1935 establishments in Washington, D.C.
Government agencies established in 1935
Cultural history of the United States
Public art in the United States
Modern art
1943 disestablishments in Washington, D.C.